Two ships in the United States Navy have been named Aquila after the constellation Aquila.

  was a cargo transport in service from 1941 to 1945.
  was a Pegasus-class hydrofoil launched in 1981.

References
 

United States Navy ship names